Laulasmaa Landscape Conservation Area is a nature park is located in Harju County, Estonia.

Its area is 131 ha.

The protected area was founded in 2005 to protect coastal landscapes of Laulasmaa with its biodiversity.

References

Nature reserves in Estonia
Geography of Harju County